Heat Shock Protein Family B (small) member 7 (HSPB7) in humans is a protein encoded by a gene of the same name with four exons that is located on chromosome 1p36.13.,. HSPB7 contains 170 amino acids and has a molecular weight of 18,611Da. HSPB7 is a member of human small heat shock protein (HSPB) family, which contains eleven family members of chaperone proteins. HSPB7 and its gene pair SRARP are located 5 kb apart on the opposite strands of chromosome 1p36.13.

Expression and molecular function

HSPB7 is widely expressed throughout the body and its highest expression is observed in the cardiac tissue ,. HSPB protein family, including HSPB7, act protectively on aggregation of several proteins containing an extended polyglutamine (polyQ) stretch that are linked to a variety of neurodegenerative diseases. Among these proteins, HSPB7 is the most potent polyQ aggregation suppressor within the HSPB family of chaperones. In addition, HSPB7 protein contains a HSP20 domain and strongly interacts with the chaperone protein 14-3-3. An interaction with the 14-3-3 protein is a common molecular feature between HSPB7 and SRARP proteins ,

Role in cardiomyopathy and Cancer

HSPB7 has cardiac protective functions and mutations in this gene leads to cardiomyopathies. It has been suggested that HSPB7 cardioprotective function is mediated by facilitating sarcomeric proteostasis. Furthermore, HSPB7 is widely inactivated in malignancies by copy-number loss and epigenetic silencing and the overexpression of this protein results in a tumor suppressor function in multiple cancer cell lines,. The overexpression of HSPB7 and its gene pair SRARP lead to a reduction in the relative phosphorylation and/or expression of Akt and ERK in cancer cells. In addition, it has been suggested that HSBP7 is regulated by p53 tumor suppressor in renal cell carcinoma.

References 

Genes on human chromosome 1
Human proteins
Genetics